Kachche Heere is a 1982 Bollywood Hindi action film directed by Narender Bedi, starring Feroz Khan, Reena Roy, Danny Denzongpa, Aruna Irani and Shakti Kapoor. The movie was produced by Netra Pal Singh and the music was composed by Rahul Dev Burman. The film was somewhat a sequel to the 1974 Blockbuster Khote Sikkay. The film had the same star cast and almost the exact story line. Among few changes were that Ranjeet was replaced by Shakti Kapoor. The film was released on 12 February 1982.

Story
The dacoits of Chambal, had some heinous characters like Lukka Singh Thakur, who not only looted, but were party to feuds amongst the ruling class to their own benefit, and one such feud was the killing of Feroz Khan's family as bounty for Kamal Singh Thakur, played by Kamal Kapoor, who supplied arms to the dacoits. After getting his brother killed by dacoits, he wanted to get his nephew sacrificed at the altar of  Goddess Durga, the main deity of rural Madhya Pradesh, and hands him over to Dilawar Singh. Dilawar Singh does not kill the child, dissuaded by his wife, who warns him of such Blasphemy, and thus they leave the village to bring up the child as their own, who is no other than Feroz Khan, called Ajnabi, or stranger throughout the movie.

Five petty thieves, Narendra Nath as Jaggu, Danny Denzongpa as Arjun, Shakti Kapoor as Salim, Sudhir (Indian Actor) as Bhaggu and Kanwar Ajit Deol as Tau Pahelwan, loot Prakash Mehra's house as fake Income tax officers, stuff the loot in a red suitcase and hide it underground at a tree in a village, in which they take refuge with the police hot on their heels. Here, they undergo a reformation, seeing the plight of the villagers under the atrocities of dacoit Lukka and his gang played by Dev Kumar.

Feroz Khan is told by Dilawar Singh that he is the real owner of the Thakur properties and gives him a Swastika locket on a neck chain as his family heirloom, as well as telling him that he has hidden the papers related to his real identity in a box, near the same place that the five thieves had hidden their loot.

Along with Feroz Khan, the five friends save the village from Lukka Singh, who is killed in the end. Ganga Aruna Irani forms the love interest of Danny,  Rani Reena Roy of  Feroz Khan and Komilla Wirk of Tau. Aruna Irani and Shakti Kapoor die in the battle that ensues with the dacoits. The film resolves into Prakash Mehra getting back his wealth and all the friends settled as good citizens under the law, thus showing the various humane angles that reform people.

Soundtrack

Cast
 Feroz Khan as Horseback Rider
 Reena Roy as Rani
 Danny Denzongpa as Arjun
 Aruna Irani as Ganga
 Shakti Kapoor as Salim
 Sudhir as Bhaggu
 Narendranath as Jaggu
 Paintal as Ramu
 Jankidas as Lala Jankidas
 Shubha Khote as Shobha
 Kamal Kapoor as Thakur Kamal Singh 
 Prakash Mehra as himself
 Dev Kumar as Thakur Lukka Singh 
 Viju Khote as Kaalia
 Mac Mohan as Fake Income Tax Officer

References

External links
 
 YouTube

1980s Hindi-language films
1981 films
Films directed by Narendra Bedi
Films scored by R. D. Burman
Indian Western (genre) films
1981 Western (genre) films